Free and Equal may refer to:

 Free and Equal (album), a 2003 album by John Surman
 Free and Equal (Italy), an Italian parliamentary group
 Free and Equal (Spain), a Spanish civic organization
 Free & Equal Elections Foundation, an American organisation that campaigns for electoral reform